is an Argentine-born Japanese former professional sumo wrestler and current professional wrestler. His highest rank was jūryō 3.

Life and career
A former swimming instructor, Salomon was spotted by a visiting Japanese coach at a gym in Buenos Aires who encouraged him to try sumo. After studying at Chuo University, he joined Michinoku stable in May 1987 at the age of 21 to support his family. He was the first, and to date only, Jewish professional sumo wrestler.  He was given the shikona (ring name) of Hoshitango, with "Hoshi" (star) a common prefix in Michinoku stable, and "tango" a reference to the popular dance. He reached the second highest jūryō division for the first time in September 1992, but lasted only one tournament there before being demoted back to the unsalaried third makushita division. He managed another three tournaments in the second division in 1994 but once again fell back. In September 1998, at the age of 33, he demonstrated his fighting spirit by once again returning to jūryō, this time remaining for 12 straight tournaments. He was not able to break into the top makuuchi division, peaking at jūryō 3 in January 2000. In July 2000 he lost every one of his fifteen bouts and fell, once more, to the third division where he remained until his retirement in January 2004. His retirement ceremony or danpatsu-shiki was attended by around 150 people including stablemates Jūmonji and Toyozakura as well as the former Terao and Kirishima, who as his stablemaster made the final cut of his topknot.

Hoshitango was joined at Michinoku stable in 1988 by another Buenos Aires native, Hoshiandesu, who reached a highest rank of jūryō 2 before retiring in 2000.

Hoshitango became a Japanese citizen in October 2000. His Japanese name was registered as Tango Hoshi.

Retirement from sumo
After retiring he opened a sports bar and restaurant called Tan & Go Dining which specialized in Japanese and South American fusion cuisine.

Fighting style
Hoshitango was an oshi-sumo specialist who preferred pushing and thrusting techniques to fighting on the mawashi. His most common winning kimarite were hataki-komi (slap down), hiki-otoshi (pull down) and okuri dashi (push out from behind).

Professional wrestling career
Imachi is currently a professional wrestler for the Japanese company DDT Pro-Wrestling (DDT), debuting on December 29, 2006, under his shikona Hoshitango, and has also wrestled for All Japan Pro Wrestling, Ice Ribbon and Wrestle-1. As a finishing maneuver, Hoshitango uses the Argentine backbreaker and chokeslam. Due to his age and outside activities, he is a semi-regular performer.

He won his first professional wrestling championship on June 3, 2007, when he briefly held the Ironman Heavymetalweight Championship. He had another brief reign on August 5. On January 24, 2009, he defeated Sanshiro Takagi to win the DDT Extreme Championship. After a successful title defence against Poison Sawada Julie in March, he lost the title to Danshoku Dino in a three-way match that also included Masa Takanashi on May 31. In 2010, Hoshitango was involved in a storyline to celebrate the 30th anniversary of Gundam. Yago Aznable (dressed in Char Aznable cosplay) and Abnormal debuted for DDT in early 2010 and proved themselves to be an annoyance to DDT owner Sanshiro Takagi. Known as the Yagou kōkoku-gun (ヤゴウ公国軍, Yagou kōkoku-gun, literally translated to "Principality of Yago"), Abnormal was kicked out of the group and replaced with DJ Nira and joined by Ace Pilot X. On June 13, Hoshitango joined the group, debuting as Mobile Armour Hoshitango, dressed in Big Zam cosplay. The storyline came to a close at Ryōgoku Peter Pan 2010 when Yagou kōkoku-gun lost a no disqualification Captain's Fall six-man tag team match.

On June 3, 2012, Hoshitango had a third brief Ironman Heavymetalweight Championship reign. On July 8, he formed the Monster Army stable with members Antonio Honda, Daisuke Sasaki Masa Takanashi, Yasu Urano and Yuji Hino. At Budokan Peter Pan, Hoshitango competed in a  "5 vs. 5 Soccer match" as part of Tonkatsu SC. The match consisted of two halves of 5 minutes each where each team tried to score the most pins by pinfall (two counts) or submission. The match ended in a 2–2 draw and was decided by an actual penalty shoot-out which saw Tonkatsu SC win 2–0. On June 23, 2013, Hoshitango, Honda and Hino won the KO-D 6-Man Tag Team Championship. They lost the titles to Danshoku Dino, Kensuke Sasaki and Makoto Oishi on July 21. On January 26, 2014, Hoshitango briefly won the Ironman Heavymetalweight Championship for a forth time. On February 23, after Hoshitango, Honda and Sasaki were defeated by Mikami, Sanshiro Takagi and Toru Owashi in a six-man tag team match, Honda announced that the Monster Army had decided to disband. At Judgement 2014, Monster Army wrestled their final match together, where Hoshitango, Hino, Honda and Sasaki defeated Gorgeous Matsuno, Gota Ihashi, Sanshiro Takagi and Toru Owashi.

With his stock significantly lowered following the end of Monster Army, in 2015 he began regularly competing for the King of Dark Championship. Contrary to regular professional wrestling championships, the title is awarded to the loser of the match and is a sign of shame. As punishment for holding the title, wrestler are forced to wrestle exclusively in dark matches. On April 2, 2016, Hoshitango "won" the King of Dark Championship after losing to Seiya Morohashi. He held the dubious distinction for 22 days before "losing" the title to Gota Ihashi on April 24.

Sumo career record

Professional wrestling championships and accomplishments
Dramatic Dream Team
DDT Extreme Championship (1 time)
Ironman Heavymetalweight Championship (3 times)
KO-D 6-Man Tag Team Championship (1 time) – with Antonio Honda and Yuji Hino
King of Dark Championship (1 time)

See also
Glossary of sumo terms
List of non-Japanese sumo wrestlers
List of past sumo wrestlers

References

External links

Hoshitango's tournament results
Dramatic Dream Team profile

1965 births
Living people
Argentine sumo wrestlers
Japanese sumo wrestlers
Argentine emigrants to Japan
Naturalized citizens of Japan
Argentine Jews
Japanese Jews
Japanese male professional wrestlers
Argentine male professional wrestlers
Jewish Argentine sportspeople
21st-century professional wrestlers
DDT Extreme Champions
Ironman Heavymetalweight Champions
King of Dark Champions
KO-D 6-Man Tag Team Champions